Millennium Office Tower is an office building located at Jalan Jenderal Sudirman, in Jakarta, Indonesia. It is owned by PT. Permata Birama Sakti, and was designed by Smallwood, Reynolds, Stewart, Steward & Assc. Inc. Construction began in 2016 and is expected to be complete in 2019. The building stands at 254 meters tall, or 833 feet. It comprises 53 floors above-ground and 6 below-ground, with 750 available parking spaces.

See also

List of tallest buildings in Indonesia
List of tallest buildings in Jakarta

References

Towers in Indonesia
Buildings and structures in Jakarta
Skyscrapers in Indonesia
Post-independence architecture of Indonesia
Skyscraper office buildings in Indonesia